′
This partial list of city nicknames in Michigan compiles the aliases, sobriquets and slogans that cities in Michigan are known by (or have been known by historically), officially and unofficially, to municipal governments, local people, outsiders or their tourism boards or chambers of commerce. City nicknames can help in establishing a civic identity, helping outsiders recognize a community or attracting people to a community because of its nickname; promote civic pride; and build community unity. Nicknames and slogans that successfully create a new community "ideology or myth" are also believed to have economic value. Their economic value is difficult to measure, but there are anecdotal reports of cities that have achieved substantial economic benefits by "branding" themselves by adopting new slogans.

Some unofficial nicknames are positive, while others are derisive. The unofficial nicknames listed here have been in use for a long time or have gained wide currency.
Adrian – The Maple City
Alma – Scotland, USA
Ann Arbor
A2 or A-squaredMichigan Lingo in 2006 Graduate Handbook for the Political Science Department of the University of Michigan
Tree Townhttp://www.a2gov.org/news/Documents/TTL_Nov_2007.pdf
 Atlanta – Elk Capital of Michigan
 Battle Creek
Breakfast Capital of the World
Cereal Bowl of the World
Cereal City
 Beaver Island – America's Emerald Isle
 Belding
Apple Capital
Silk City
 Berrien Springs – Christmas Pickle Capital of the World
Cadillac – Chestnut Town USA
Calumet – Coppertown USA
 Champion – Horse Pulling Capital of the U.P.
 Colon – Magic Capital of the World
 Davison – City of Flags
 Detroit
America's Comeback City
Arsenal of Democracy
City of Trees
Hitsville, USA
HockeytownSaul Anuzis, All Eyes Look to Michigan: A Report From the Presidential Hustings, Human Events, November 6, 2007
The Motor CityClaims to Fame - Business, Epodunk, accessed April 16, 2007
 Motown
 The D
 The Paris of the Midwest
 The Renaissance CityDetroit: Sights & Activities, Fodor's, accessed May 8, 2007 "Though the city nicknamed itself "Renaissance City" in the 1970s, it did little to deserve the title until recently."
 Drummond Island – Gem of the Huron
Dundee – Hub of the Highways
Eaton Rapids – The Island City
 Eau Claire – Cherry Pit Spitting Capital of the World 
 Elsie – Michigan's Dairy Capital
Escanaba – Esky
 Fairview – Wild Turkey Capital of Michigan
 Flint
 The Auto City
 The Birthplace of General Motors
 Buick City
 The Vehicle City
 Frankenmuth – Michigan's Little Bavaria
 Fremont – Baby Food Capital of the World
 Gaylord – Michigan's Alpine Village
 Glenn – The Pancake Town
 Grand Haven – Coast Guard City, USA
 Grand Rapids
 Furniture City
 Beer City USA
 Greenville – The Danish Festival City
Hamtramck 
 City Within the City
 The World Within Two Square Miles
 Holland – Tulip City
 Huntington Woods – City of Homes
 Jackson – Birthplace of the Republican Party
 Kalamazoo
 Bedding Plant Capital of the World
 Celery City
 Kazoo (or K'Zoo)
 Mall City (first outdoor pedestrian mall in the US)
 The Paper City
Kalkaska – Trout Capital of Michigan
Kingsley – A Little Bit of Paradise
Lake City – Christmas Tree Capital
Linwood – Michigan's Walleye Capital
Manistee – Salt City
 Marquette – Queen City of the North
Mayfield – Birthplace of the Adams Fly
 Mesick – Mushroom Capital of the World
 Mount Clemens – Bath City
 Mount Pleasant – The Oil Capital of Michigan
 Muskegon
 The Beer Tent Capital of the World
 Port City
 The Riviera of the Midwest
 Lumber Queen of the World
 The Skee
 Skeetown
 Naubinway – Top of the Lake
 Negaunee – Irontown, USA
 Newberry – Moose Capital of Michigan
 Niles
The City of Four Flags
Garden City
 Northville – Switzerland of Wayne County
Oceana County – Asparagus Capital of the World
 Omer – Michigan's Smallest City
 Onaway – Sturgeon Capital of Michigan
Oscoda – Paddletown USA
 Paradise – Wild Blueberry Capital of Michigan
 Pellston – Icebox of the Nation
 Pinconning – Cheese Capital of Michigan
Plainwell – The Island City
Port Huron – Maritime Capital of the Great Lakes
 Portland – City of Two Rivers
Rogers City
 The Nautical City
 Rocket City
 Romulus – Gateway to the World, Romtown
 Rudyard – Snowy Owl Capital of Michigan
 Saint Johns – The Mint City
 Saint Louis – Middle of the Mitten
 Sault Ste. Marie
 The Soo
 Michigan's Oldest City (founded 1668)
 South Haven – Blueberry Capital of the World
Sturgis – Electric City
Taylor – Taylortucky
Traverse City
Cherry Capital of the World
Hockeytown North
 Utica 
Hothouse Rhubarb Capital of the World
Mushroom Capital of Michigan
 Vassar – Cork Pine City
 Vicksburg – The Village with a Vision
 Whitefish Point – Cranberry Capital of Michigan
Ypsilanti
 Ypsi
 Ypsiltucky

See also
 List of city nicknames in the United States
 List of cities, villages, and townships in Michigan

References

External links
 a list of American and a few Canadian nicknames
 U.S. cities list

Michigan cities and towns
Populated places in Michigan
City nicknames